The eastern false pipistrelle (Falsistrellus tasmaniensis) is a vesper bat that occurs in eastern and south-eastern Australia, including the island of Tasmania.

Taxonomy 
A species of genus Falsistrellus, allied to the family Vespertilionidae. The bats are distinguished from a western species, Falsistrellus mackenziei, by the common names eastern false pipistrelle and eastern falsistrelle. The first description was published by John Gould in his third volume of Mammals of Australia, issued in 1858. It is the type species for the genus Falsistrellus.

Description 
A falsistrelle bat—resembling the species Falsistrellus mackenziei—with brownish fur over the back, dark or reddish, and a lighter greyish colour at the front. The ear is prominent from the fur, and characteristic notches are seen at the outer margin of each lobe. The ear notch readily distinguishes it from a similar bat that occurs in the range, species Scoteanax rueppellii (greater broad-nosed bat, Rüppell's broad-nosed bat).

References

Bats of Australia
Mammals of Tasmania
Falsistrellus
Mammals described in 1858
Taxa named by John Gould
Mammals of South Australia
Mammals of New South Wales
Mammals of Queensland
Mammals of Victoria (Australia)
Taxonomy articles created by Polbot